NGC 6881 is a planetary nebula, located in the constellation of Cygnus.  It is formed of an inner nebula, estimated to be about one fifth of a light-year across, and a symmetrical structure that spreads out about one light-year from one tip to the other. The symmetry could be due to a binary star at the nebula's centre.

References

External links 
 

Cygnus (constellation)
Planetary nebulae
6881